Mikhail Borisovich Leitman (14 January 1937, Baku — 11 February 2002, Rehovot) was a Azerbaijani-Jewish scientist and an IT specialist.

Early life 
On 14 January 1947, Leitman was born as Mikhail Borisovich Leitman in Baku, USSR. Leitman's father was Boris Mikhailovich Leitman (1912—1970), one of the most prominent leaders of the construction industry of Azerbaijan SSR. 
Leitman's uncles Isaak Mikhailovich (1908-1938) and Saul Mikhailovich (1910-1990) were repeatedly persecuted in the 1920s and 1930s by Soviet authorities.

In 1953, Leitman graduated from Baku Secondary School.

Education 
In 1959, Leitman graduated  from Azerbaijan Industrial Institute, with honors in Automation, Telemechanics and Electrical Measurement. In 1964 he defended his thesis and continued to work at the Institute. Leitman worked as an engineer and conducted research on the topic of methods of depth measurements in wells.

Career 
In August 1966, Leitman began working at the Department of Automation and Remote Control of the Smolensk branch of Moscow Power Engineering Institute (MPEI), and soon was appointed head of this Department.

Along with teaching, he conducted extensive scientific research work, on the basis of which he consulted post-graduate students, forming his own school in the field of Information technology. In August 1990 he emigrated from USSR and worked in several United States-based companies which established broadband Internet network and tried to solve other relevant IT problems.

Personal life 
Leitman died on 11 February 2002 in Rehovot, Israel.

He was the author of more than 200 scientific works. Veteran of Labour.

Leitman's son is Alexander Chernitsky, a Russian writer and historian.

Selected inventions 
 The Power Measuring Converter. A.S. No. 1522116, 1989, USSR
 The Instrument for Active Power Measurement. A.S. No. 1406504, 1988, USSR
 The Measuring Converter of Power for Three-Phase Networks. A.S. No. 1397846, 1988, USSR
 The Active Power Measuring Converter. A.S. No. 1314276, 1987, USSR
 The Voltage to Frequency Measuring Converter. A.S. No. 1218464, 1986, USSR
 The Frequency Deviation Measuring Converter. A.S. No. 1213429, 1986, USSR

References

1937 births
2002 deaths
Scientists from Baku
Soviet Jews
Azerbaijani Jews
Academic staff of Moscow Power Engineering Institute
Azerbaijan State Oil and Industry University alumni
Soviet emigrants to Israel